Benjamin Jones was a Negro league outfielder in the 1930s.

Jones made his Negro leagues debut in 1931 with the Homestead Grays. He went on to play the following season with the Washington Pilots.

References

External links
 and Seamheads

Place of birth missing
Place of death missing
Year of birth missing
Year of death missing
Homestead Grays players
Washington Pilots players
Baseball outfielders